Spin angular momentum may refer to:

 Spin angular momentum of light, a property of electromagnetic waves
 A type of quantum mechanics angular momentum operator